The disappearance of Ophélie Bretnacher is an unsolved criminal case involving Ophélie Bretnacher, a French exchange student. The case was closed in 2014.

Background 
Ophélie Bretnacher was a French Exchange student participating in the Erasmus Programme. She disappeared in Budapest, Hungary on December 4, 2008. CCTV cameras were able to track part of her route, determining that she left a nightclub called Portside of Cuba. The footage shows her walking from Dohány Street to Deák Square, up to the Széchenyi Chain Bridge, and across the Danube. The CCTV footage has since been uploaded to YouTube. 

Investigations revealed that she left Portside of Cuba, the nightclub, after having celebrated Saint Nicholas Day with friends. She was walking in the direction of her home. Her handbag, which contained her cell phone among other personal belongings, was found later that evening on the Széchenyi Chain Bridge by two Italian students. Her closest friends and her host family, concerned for her whereabouts, contacted her family the following day. 

Friends and family members made many attempts to locate her. An official investigation was opened in Hungary, followed shortly afterward by one in France. Two months later, in February 2009, her body was discovered in Csepel, an island in the Danube.

Investigation
After the discovery of her body, Hungarian authorities assigned a seven-member police team to investigate the case. The police said that suicide or an accident were the likely causes of her death. However, homicide was also considered a possibility, because a hematoma was found on Ophelie's body and there were many gray areas during the investigation. One fact contributing to the dispute over her cause of death was that her body was found upstream.

In February 2010, her family filed a new claim for murder.

In March 2010, a judicial inquiry was opened in Paris for kidnapping, unlawful confinement and murder. By 2014, authorities in Hungary were prepared to close the case, considering the investigation deadline was set to expire in February of that year. New information reportedly surfaced, prompting the Budapest prosecutor's office to continue the inquiry. Sources say that the investigation resumed due to inconsistencies in the testimonies of the interrogated witnesses.

The Hungarian investigation was closed in 2014.

Political and diplomatic consequences
While Hungarian police concluded that the case could either be a suicide or accidental drowning, in France there was public clamor for a more thorough investigation. An online petition has been signed by over 10,000 people and was sent to the French President. On January 11, 2009, several hundred people marched silently in a white march, from the Champ-de-Mars, near the Eiffel Tower, to encourage the involvement of the French authorities.

French politicians also expressed interest in continuing the investigation, including Catherine Vautrin, the Vice-Président of the National Assembly Following this intervention, French investigators were sent to Hungary for a second time.

See also 
 List of people who disappeared mysteriously

References

External links
 11/01/2009 film of a demonstration asking for more collaboration between french and hungarian police - AFP document

Kidnappings in Hungary
France–Hungary relations
2008 in Hungary
2000s in Budapest
December 2008 events in Europe